Nicolas May (30 September 1927 – 12 January 2006) was a Luxembourgian footballer. He competed in the men's tournament at the 1948 Summer Olympics.

References

External links
 

1927 births
2006 deaths
Luxembourgian footballers
Luxembourg international footballers
Olympic footballers of Luxembourg
Footballers at the 1948 Summer Olympics
People from Differdange
Association football defenders
FA Red Boys Differdange players